Robert Vernay (May 30, 1907 in Paris – October 17, 1979 in Paris) was a French director and screenwriter.

Career
In 1937, Vernay worked as assistant director to Julien Duvivier on Pépé le Moko.

In 1944, Vernay directed an adaptation of Balzac's Père Goriot, starring Pierre Renoir. It was released in 1945. In the late 1950s, he directed a "tacky comedy" called Madame et son auto. It was a favourite film of René Magritte.

Selected filmography
 Pépé le Moko (1937) as assistant director
 Arlette and Love (1943)
 The Count of Monte Cristo (1943)
 Father Goriot (1945)
 The Captain (1946)
 Emile the African (1949)
 Fantomas Against Fantomas (1949)
 The Dream of Andalusia (1951)
 Double or Quits (1953)
 The Count of Monte Cristo (1954)
 Let's Be Daring, Madame (1957)
 Madame et son auto (1958)

References

External links

1907 births
1979 deaths
French film directors
French male screenwriters
20th-century French screenwriters
20th-century French male writers